Aabaar Bochhor Kuri Pore() is a Bengali album by various musical groups and artists with a collaboration by the rock band Moheener Ghoraguli. It was released in 1995 by Asha Audio at Kolkata. This album is not an original Moheen's album, like their earlier releases. It was released nearly twenty years after the last album by the group had been released in 1979.

Many of the songs were not composed by Moheener Ghoraguli, and none of them were sung by the group. Where Moheener Ghoraguli acted as an umbrella to bring disparate bands and individuals together and provided a platform to these upcoming talents of the Bengali music scene to perform.

Since their last album, most of the Moheener Ghoraguli members had moved ahead with their careers and lives, and so the only person involved in the making of this, and the next three albums, was Gautam Chattopadhyay.

Packaging
Aabaar Bochhor Kuri Pore cover art depicts the seahorse which is an icon of the band. Cover and album artwork design by Hiran Mitra. In January 1995, a booklet of the album in the same name was published in Kolkata Book Fair.

Track listing

Personnel
Artists
 Gautam Chattopadhyay– vocal
 Antara Chowdhury– vocal
 Rituparna Das– vocal
 Chandrima Mitra– vocal
 Paroma Banerji– vocal
 Prabir Das– vocal
 Arunendu Das– vocal
 Surojit Chatterjee– vocal
 Dibyo Mukhopadhyay– vocal

Groups
 Lakkhichhara
 Garer Maath
 Krosswindz

Technical
 Debjit Biswas– sound
 Tushar Halder– coordination
 Tapas Das– coordination
 Moheener Ghoraguli– coordination
 Gautam Chattopadhyay– chief editor
 Hiran Mitra– cover

References

Citations

External links

1995 albums
Moheener Ghoraguli albums
Bengali-language albums